Ring It Up!, released on 8 September 2012, was the 2012–2013 robotics competition for FIRST Tech Challenge. In the competition, two alliances, each consisting of two teams, competed to score plastic rings on a set of pegs aligned in a three-dimensional tic-tac-toe board. Ring It Up! is the eighth FTC challenge. More than 2400 teams competed worldwide, surpassing the number of competitors in the previous year's Bowled Over! challenge.

Alliances
In each match, the four teams competing were organised into red and blue alliances. The members of an alliance competed together to earn points. Alliances were selected randomly prior to the start of each competition.

Field
The field for the competition was a square measuring 12 feet by 12 feet, which could be constructed by teams for practising prior to competitions. In the centre of the field there is a vertically constructed set of pegs, which are arranged in a three-by-three grid (as a tic-tac-toe board). Along the edges of the field, there are other pegs, each of which contains a set of six red or blue rings, which can be harvested and scored by the corresponding alliance. The field is also divided into two triangular sides, one red and one blue.

Scoring
There were three sections to the game: the Autonomous Period, the Driver-Controlled (or Tele-Operated) Period, and the End Game. The criteria for scoring was different during each segment.

Autonomous Period
In the Autonomous Period, robots could run autonomously for thirty seconds. Infrared beacons were placed randomly on a peg in the tic-tac-toe board prior to the start of the match, but after autonomous programs have been selected. Each robot was allowed to begin with one specially-marked autonomous ring. Unscored rings were removed by referees after the end of the Autonomous Period. An infrared sensor is available to aid in autonomously locating the IR beacon.

Driver-Controlled Period
During the two-minute Driver-Controlled Period, teams could use standard gamepad controllers, each with two joysticks, to operate their robots.

End Game
In FTC, the final thirty seconds of the Driver-Controlled Period are referred to as the End Game. During the Ring It Up! End Game, teams were permitted to attempt to score points for special tasks, but these tasks could not begin before the start of End Game.

Advancement criteria
During tournaments and championships, match wins did not necessarily take priority over other advancement criteria. As in all FTC challenges, the winner of the top judged award (the Inspire Award) ranked higher than the winner of the competition-based component (Winning Alliance Captain). Winning lesser judged awards (Think Award, Connect Award, etc.) also played a part in the advancement order.  The criteria for the Inspire Award are "...match performance, observations made during interviews and in the pit area, and the team’s Engineering Notebook as equal factors...". Criteria for the other awards also include robot design, creativity, innovation, team performance, outreach and enthusiasm.

For the Ring It Up! challenge, a new format for qualifying competitions was introduced in the United States regions for Florida, New Jersey, Pennsylvania, Washington, and St. Louis. Shorter competitions, called "meets", were held over weekends. Meets were smaller, shorter and more frequent than normal qualifying competitions. This makes the format more accessible for new teams, in addition to providing more opportunities for structured practice in the company of other local teams. They were designed for participation more similar to participation in organised sport at the high school age.

Notes

2012 in robotics